Ezio is a folk band from Cambridge, England, formed in 1990. They are named after their lead singer and main composer, Ezio Lunedei.

Members
 Ezio Lunedei, lead singer, guitar and main composer
 Mark "Booga" Fowell, guitar
 Lidia Cascarino, bass
 Lee Russell, percussion, steel guitar and other instruments
 Alex Reeves, drums.

The band vary their on-stage line-up depending on the venue; some gigs feature all five members in the line-up, whereas some gigs in smaller venues will have just Ezio and Fowell.

Career
The band has released eight studio albums, one compilation album, four live albums and three videos / DVDs. Their song Cancel Today was chosen by Tony Blair for his Desert Island Discs selection, stating that he listened to this before Prime Minister's Questions.

Discography

Studio albums
 The Angel Song (1993) - Salami Records
 Black Boots on Latin Feet (1995) - Arista Records
 Diesel Vanilla (1997) - Arista Records
 Higher (2000) - Salami Records
 The Making of Mr. Spoons (2003) - Eagle Records
 Ten Thousand Bars (2006) - Tapete Records
 This Is the Day (2010) - Tapete Records
 Adam and the Snake (2014) - Tapete Records
 Daylight Moon (2016) - Jazzhaus Records

Compilation albums
 Lost and Found (Volume 2) (2006) - Salami Records

Live albums
 Live at the Shepherds Bush Empire (1999) - Salami Records
 Live:Cambridge (2004) - Salami Records
 Das Bootleg - Live in Mannheim (Part 1) (2008) - Salami Records
 Ten Thousand Bars - Live (2008) - Tapete Records

DVDs
 Ezio Live (1996) - Salami Records
 Live at the Shepherds Bush Empire (1999) - Salami Records
 Live at the Junction (2005) - Salami Records

References

External links

 Official site
 Ezio at MySpace

 Fan gig review

Musical groups from Cambridge
Musical groups established in 1990
Tapete Records artists